Abner is the uncle of Saul and commander-in-chief of his army in the Bible.

Abner may also refer to:

Abner (name)
Abner, North Carolina, an unincorporated community
Abner Pond, Plymouth, Massachusetts
Abner Records, record label
Abner, Texas, an unincorporated community
ABNER (detonator), the code name for the neutron generating trigger used in the Little Boy atomic bomb; see Urchin (detonator)
Abner (computer), an early electronic computer used by the National Security Agency

See also
Li'l Abner (1934-1977), comic strip